Don Muthu Swami is a 2008 Indian Hindi-language comedy-drama film directed by Ashim Samanta starring Mithun Chakraborty as the Don. The movie is a remake of 1991 American movie Oscar which itself was a remake of 1967 French movie Oscar.

Songs
"I Am A Disco Dancer (New)" - Vijay Benedict
"I Love You I Love You" - Deepali Kishore, Emon Chatterjee
"Jeena Bhi Kya" - Salma Agha, Bappi Lahiri 
"Jhoom Le Jhoom Le" - Anu Malik
"Jimmy Aaja" - Parvati Khan
"Pyaar Do Pyaar Lo" - Kishore Kumar, Anand Kumar C.
"Saath Saath Tum Chalo" - Asha Bhosle, Bhupinder Singh 
"Tum Kaun Ho" - Shaan,  Mahalaxmi Iyer

Cast 
Mithun Chakraborty as  Don Muthu Swami
Hrishitaa Bhatt  as Sanjana
Shakti Kapoor as Noora
Rohit Roy as Preetam
Mohit Raina As Jaikishan
Dolly Minhas as Lata
Dilip Joshi as Fikarchand
Rakesh Bedi as  Shikharchand
Meghna Malik as  Savitri
Ali Asgar as Rehman
Viju Khote as  Usmaan
Ashwin Kaushal as Salim
Achyut Potdar as  Ishwar
Birbal as Pundit
Upasna Singh as Barkha
Ali Razak as Commissioner 
Yusuf Hussain as Chit Fund1
Vishal Kotian as Veeru
Sonia Kapoor as Guleri
Aroon Bakshi as  Phatkay
Mithalesh as Chit Fund 2
Anusmriti Sarkar as Ranjana

Reception 

The Times of India wrote that "Don Muthuswamy wants to mend his ways and find a suitable boy for his daughter who is ready to run away with a driver. He zeros down on a crook (Rohit Roy), because the other crook he had chosen walks away with his maid instead. But while he's stealing back his jewels, which the crook had stolen from him, his daughter steals away with the Urdu teacher instead. Too complicated, too stretched out, terribly unhinged...The only thing that could lure you is nostalgia: Mithunda ka ishtyle"

References

External links 
 

2008 films
2000s Hindi-language films
2008 comedy films
Films scored by Anu Malik
Indian slapstick comedy films
Indian remakes of French films
Films directed by Ashim Samanta
Hindi-language comedy films